The Cassiar Terrane is a  long Cretaceous terrane located in the Northern Interior of British Columbia and southern Yukon. It consists of miogeoclinal strata and contains the Cassiar Batholith, a 100-million-year-old igneous intrusion and the single largest intrusive body in the hinterland of the Canadian portion of the Western Cordillera.

References

Terranes
Cretaceous System of North America
Cretaceous British Columbia
Cretaceous Yukon
Stratigraphy of British Columbia
Stratigraphy of Yukon